Dundee is an unincorporated community in Carter County, Oklahoma, United States. The community has also been called McMan. The McMan post office opened in 1916 and closed in 1966.

Notes

Unincorporated communities in Carter County, Oklahoma
Unincorporated communities in Oklahoma